Summit School may refer to:

 Summit School (Nyack), New York
 Summit School (Queens), New York
 Summit School (Winston-Salem, North Carolina) in Winston-Salem, North Carolina
 Summit School (Seattle, Washington), in Seattle, Washington

See also
 Summit Middle School (disambiguation)
 Summit High School (disambiguation)
 Summit School District 104, Summit, Illinois
 St. Paul Academy and Summit School, Saint Paul, Minnesota